Vice-Admiral Thomas Wyndham (1508–1554) was an English naval officer, naval administrator, explorer, and navigator. He was appointed a member of the Council of the Marine as one of the Chief Officers of the Admiralty in 1552 and given the title of Master of Naval Ordnance and was simultaneously a member of the Board of Ordnance until 1553.

Family and early life
Wyndham was born around 1510, the son of Sir Thomas Wyndham of Felbrigg and Elizabeth Wentworth. His grandfather, Sir John Wyndham, was implicated in the conspiracy of Edmund de la Pole, earl of Suffolk, and executed for treason in 1502. When his father died in 1522, Wyndham was left in the general care of his father's executors, Thomas Howard, earl of Surrey, Thomas Howard, duke of Norfolk, and "my moost singuler good Lord" Cardinal Wolsey. Arrangements were made for his education at the University of Louvain and possibly in Italy. His father also left his son substantial properties "to bye a marriage for him of Inheritaunce". Wyndham later married and had one son, Henry, and two daughters.

Career
From 1536 to 1540, Wyndham was employed in Ireland as a servant of Thomas Cromwell. In 1539, he was appointed captain of one hundred soldiers and experienced heavy fighting in Ireland under the leadership of James Butler, earl of Ormond. In 1540, ill health forced his return to England where he was awarded the former monastery of Chicksand, Bedfordshire.

The first known instance of his service at sea occurred in 1542 when he commanded a vessel fighting against Scotland in the North Sea. In 1545 Wyndham and William Hawkins seized the Spanish ship Santa Maria de Guadeloupe. Judged an act of piracy, they were ordered by the privy council to pay compensation. Additional allegations of piracy were made against Wyndham over the next several years.

During the Anglo-Scottish war of the Rough Wooing, Wyndham commanded a ship at the landing at Edinburgh in 1544. In December 1547 he sailed two ships to Dundee to support the English garrison at Broughty Castle commanded by Andrew Dudley. He investigated the River Tay towards Perth looking to rob church roofs to make lead bullets. On Christmas Day 1547 he burnt Balmerino Abbey and on 29 December he burnt Elcho Nunnery. On land, in January he placed a garrison of 20 men with cannon and hand guns on the steeple of St Mary's at Dundee, with the help of Andrew Dudley and the Scottish Lord Gray. He constructed a battery at Haddington called "Wyndham's bulwark". With James Wilford on 3 June 1548, he captured Dalkeith Palace (and with it, James Douglas, the future Regent Morton), and razed the town by fire.

However, near the end of the war, the English commander, the Duke of Rutland, was required to investigate Wyndham's activities capturing foreign merchant vessels in the Firth. These disputed prizes included a coal-ship, seven Norwegian vessels laden with meal, pitch and timber, 4 French ships, a small warship he gave to his nephew, John Luttrell, another ship laden with soap and madder, and others. On 29 March 1550, the day peace was declared in England, Wyndham was sent to Scotland with two post horses and five Scottish hostages to exchange for Luttrell, who had been captured at Broughty.

Around 1550, Hans Eworth painted Wyndham's, Wilford's, and John Luttrell's portraits. Wyndham wears a powder flask at his neck and a gun over his shoulder inscribed, "TW, aetatis XLII.MDL," indicating he was 42 in 1550. In 1590, the picture was called, "Of Mr Thomas Wyndham drowned in the Sea returninge from Ginny."

"Ginny", meaning Guinea, was the name used for the western part of Africa now including Nigeria. The voyage to Guinea was backed by George Barnes of London. The planned voyage was noted by the Imperial ambassador Jean Scheyfve. In May 1553 Scheyfve thought Wyndham might employ a Portuguese pilot called Pinteado and sail in July. Thomas Wyndham's crew for this 1553 expedition included a future noteworthy explorer in his own right, Martin Frobisher. Wyndham and his crew were received in person by the Oba (king) of Benin City, who in turn traded with them. Wyndham died in 1554 at sea off Benin, on the return leg of his voyage. He left John Luttrell £100 in his will.

References

Bibliography
 
 
 
 
 
 
 Historical Manuscripts Commission, 12th report, Appendix, part 4, The Manuscripts of the Duke of Rutland at Belvoir Castle, vol. 1, (1888)

1510 births
1554 deaths
16th-century Royal Navy personnel
English admirals
English sailors
English people of the Rough Wooing
Old University of Leuven alumni
People from Felbrigg